The Bentiaba (or Rio de São Nicolau or Saint Nicolas River) is a river in southern Angola. Its mouth is at the Atlantic Ocean near the commune of Bentiaba in Namibe Province.

The riverbank has produced a number of Cretaceous fossils including mosasaurs from Itombe Formation.

Bentiaba is also the name given to the Cretaceous bonebed.

See also
List of rivers of Angola

References

Rivers of Angola